Celtic Cross was a musical collaboration of Simon Posford (Hallucinogen, Shpongle), Martin Glover (bassist from Killing Joke) and Saul Davies (violinist from James).  The style of music could be described as psychedelic rock, ambient and dub music with ethnic influences.  The cover of the Hicksville album was designed by Mark Neal, the same artist who worked on Posford's Twisted and The Lone Deranger, as well as the Shpongle albums.

Discography
Hicksville (Liquid Sound Design, Nova Tekk Records 1998)
Hicksville (Remastered & Remixed) (Avatar Records 2009)

References

British electronic music groups
British techno music groups
British ambient music groups
British dance music groups